Van is an unincorporated community in Lee County, Virginia, in the United States.

A post office was established at Van in 1884, and remained in operation until it was discontinued in 1906. The community was named for Rev. John B. Van, an early postmaster.

References

Unincorporated communities in Lee County, Virginia
Unincorporated communities in Virginia